Alexis Georgievich Toth (or Alexis of Wilkes-Barre; March 18, 1853 – May 7, 1909) was a Russian Orthodox church leader in the Midwestern United States who, having resigned his position as a Byzantine Catholic priest in the Ruthenian Catholic Church, became responsible for the conversions of approximately 20,000 Eastern Rite Catholics to the Russian Orthodox Church, which contributed to the growth of Eastern Orthodoxy in the United States and the eventual establishment of the Orthodox Church in America. He was canonized by the Orthodox Church in 1994.

Early life
Alexis Georgievich Toth was born to George and Cecilia Toth (or Tovt) on March 14, 1853,  in Kobylnice, near Prešov in the Szepes county of Slovakia (then a part of the Austrian Empire) during the reign of Franz Joseph.  Having completed his primary schooling, he attended a Roman Catholic seminary for one year, followed by three years in a Greek Catholic seminary and additional time at the University of Prague, where he graduated with a degree in theology.

Toth married Rosalie Mihalics on April 18, 1878, and was ordained to the priesthood in 1878 by Bishop Nicholas Toth, the Greek Catholic Bishop of Prešov. Following the death of his wife and child a few years later, he served in local parishes, as diocesan chancellor, and as professor and director at the Greek Catholic seminary of Prešov. In 1889, Fr. Alexis' bishop received a petition from the Ruthenian Catholic Church in the United States, asking that Toth be sent to them as a priest. He arrived on November 15, 1889, and by the 27th of that month was holding services at St. Mary's Greek Catholic Church in Minneapolis, Minnesota. Finding the church barely furnished and deeply in debt, he set about rectifying the situation, ultimately bringing the parish to a place of fiscal stability whilst never drawing a salary.

Conflict with Bishop John Ireland
As an Eastern Rite Catholic, Toth honored the custom of paying a visit to the local Latin Church Catholic bishop in his area, since there was no Eastern Rite Catholic bishop serving in the United States at that time. The ordinary of the Roman Catholic Archdiocese of Saint Paul and Minneapolis was John Ireland, who had been attempting to "Americanize" German and other Catholic immigrants, and was hostile to ethnic parishes such as the one in which Toth served.

When speaking of their meeting, Toth later claimed that Ireland became angry and threw Toth's priestly credentials onto his table while ardently protesting his presence in the city. Toth reported that Ireland said he did not consider Toth or his bishop to be truly Catholic, in clear contradiction of the Union of Uzhhorod and papal decrees to the contrary. Toth reported that the conversation became more heated as it progressed, with both men losing their tempers. Ireland refused to give Toth permission to serve as a priest in Minneapolis, and furthermore ordered his parishes and priests not to have anything to do with the Ruthenian Catholic priest or his parishioners. Although Toth sent letters to his bishop in Hungary, detailing his experience and requesting specific instructions, he reportedly never received a reply.

Toth came to believe that he and other Eastern Rite Catholic priests in North America were to be recalled to Europe, and their parishioners folded into existing Roman Catholic congregations in their respective cities.

From Rome to Russian Orthodoxy
Having heard nothing from his own bishop, he and other Eastern Rite Catholic priests who had shared similar experiences began to cast about for a solution to their dilemma. In December 1890, they contacted the Russian consul in San Francisco, California, asking to be put in touch with a Russian Orthodox bishop. Correspondence and personal meetings with Bishop Vladimir Sokolovsky of San Francisco followed, culminating in Toth's decision to formally enter the Russian Orthodox Church in March 1892. Toth was accompanied by 361 fellow Eastern Rite Catholics; thousands more would follow in the years to come, largely due to his own efforts to evangelize them toward this move. 

Following his conversion to Orthodoxy, Toth tirelessly preached his new faith to other Eastern Rite Catholics in North America. This, combined with further demands by U.S. Latin bishops against Eastern Rite parishes facilitated the conversion of over 20,000 Eastern-rite Catholics to Russian Orthodoxy by the time Toth died in 1909. The Orthodox Church in America has claimed that by 1916 the Latin Catholic Church had lost 163 Eastern Rite parishes, with over 100,000 faithful, to the Russian missionary diocese.

Death and glorification

Toth was elevated to the rank of protopresbyter later in life, continuing his efforts to convert the Eastern Catholics of North America to Eastern Orthodoxy.  He died on May 7, 1909, in Wilkes-Barre, Pennsylvania, and was honored with a special shrine at St. Tikhon's Monastery in South Canaan, Pennsylvania. On May 29, 1994, Toth was glorified (canonized) as Saint Alexis of Wilkes-Barre by the Orthodox Church in America, whose establishment and membership numbers are largely traceable to his efforts.

Notes

External links

Alexis of Wilkes-Barre.  Biography of St. Alexis Toth from the OrthodoxWiki website.
Orthodox Christians in North America: 1792–1994, Chapter 2, contains info on Toth, including particulars of his conversation with Bishop Ireland.
 Ὁ Ἅγιος Ἀλέξιος ὁ Ὑπερασπιστὴς τῆς Ὀρθοδόξου Πίστεως. 7 Μαΐου. ΜΕΓΑΣ ΣΥΝΑΞΑΡΙΣΤΗΣ.

1853 births
1909 deaths
People from Svidník District
American people of Rusyn descent
Austro-Hungarian emigrants to the United States
American saints of the Eastern Orthodox Church
Converts to Eastern Orthodoxy from Catholicism
20th-century Christian saints
Russian saints
Married Eastern Orthodoxy clergy
Russian people of Slovak descent